The Reddy Group commenced operation as a small construction company in Suva, Fiji Islands in 1947. This opened the way for it to form a joint venture with Fletcher Construction of New Zealand.
The second eldest brother Ram Sami Reddy started Reddy Construction Company in 1947 taking up construction of residential buildings. He was later joined by his other brother Ranga Sami Reddy. Yanktesh Permal (YP) Reddy joined the Company in 1957 and this allowed Ram Sami Reddy to move to Lautoka to open the branch in the West where there was a sudden surge of growth in the building industry.

In a short time, the Company had taken up some ambitious contracts and completed projects becoming one of the local building construction companies.

The younger brother, YP who had also moved to Lautoka in 1957 was soon looking at diversifying and entering into other fields of commercial activities. Besides acquiring some commercial and residential properties in Suva and the West for investment, YP in 1965 launched Reddy's Enterprises Limited to invest in tourism which was showing promise of becoming an important industry for the Fijian economy.

The Group acquired a prime site in the Nadi International Airport area and built a hotel which was to become the famous Tanoa Hotel. After operating a tourist hotel as the first local operator, the company soon started acquiring other hotels. RakiRaki in 1968, Skylodge in 1973 and Nadi Travelodge in 1992.
In 1987, the Tanoa Group built a new 20-room hotel in Lautoka, the Tanoa Waterfront Hotel to cater for the need of accommodation for corporate visitors to the West. The Group soon added more rooms to the Tanoa Waterfront. This was followed up with the acquisition of a hotel in central Suva which was extensively renovated and refurbished and re-opened as Tanoa Plaza which gave the Group a foothold in Suva.

Reddy Construction went into joint venture with Parkinson's UK Group to undertake construction of the prestigious, Lautoka Government Hospital. Soon after that it went into joint venture with Fletcher Construction of New Zealand to take up even more ambitious construction projects amongst which were the University of the South Pacific building extensions, ANZ Bank complex in Suva, Lautoka and Suva Wharves, Sugar Mill boilers installation and the Sheraton Hotel in Denarau.

After the 1987 Military Coup and the death of his two brothers, Ram Sami in 1985 and Ranga Sami in 1988, YP decided to downsize activities in the construction field and concentrate on Hotels and Real Estate investments.

The Reddy Group in 1970 took up shares in Clyde Engineering Co Ltd, a NZ company which expanded its operations in Fiji to market and service heavy construction and industrial equipment in the South Pacific. In 1983, the Group acquired 100% share holding in Clyde. In its programme of diversification Clyde acquired the scaffolding hire business of Boral Acrow, an Australian Company in 2001 and Nacap Hire in 2006.

Recently the Group has entered into the financial services sector in Fiji. Together with a joint venture partner from New Zealand, the Reddy Group has launched an insurance brokerage firm specializing in all types of general and commercial insurance.

References

Real estate companies of Fiji
1947 establishments in Fiji
Real estate companies established in 1947